In mathematics, specifically in algebraic combinatorics and commutative algebra, the complete homogeneous symmetric polynomials are a specific kind of symmetric polynomials. Every symmetric polynomial can be expressed as a polynomial expression in complete homogeneous symmetric polynomials.

Definition
Formally,

The formula can also be written as:

The first few of these polynomials are

Thus, for each nonnegative integer , there exists exactly one complete homogeneous symmetric polynomial of degree  in  variables.

Another way of rewriting the definition is to take summation over all sequences , without condition of ordering :

here  is the multiplicity of number  in the sequence .

For example

The polynomial ring formed by taking all integral linear combinations of products of the complete homogeneous symmetric polynomials is a commutative ring.

Examples

For :

For :

For :

Properties

Generating function
The complete homogeneous symmetric polynomials are characterized by the following identity of formal power series in :

(this is called the generating function, or generating series, for the complete homogeneous symmetric polynomials). Here each fraction in the final expression is the usual way to represent the formal geometric series that is a factor in the middle expression. The identity can be justified by considering how the product of those geometric series is formed: each factor in the product is obtained by multiplying together one term chosen from each geometric series, and every monomial in the variables  is obtained for exactly one such choice of terms, and comes multiplied by a power of  equal to the degree of the monomial.

The formula above can be seen as a special case of the MacMahon master theorem. On the left hand side, one can identify the complete homogeneous symmetric polynomials as special cases of the multinomial coefficient that appears in the MacMahon expression.

Relation with the elementary symmetric polynomials

There is a fundamental relation between the elementary symmetric polynomials and the complete homogeneous ones:

which is valid for all , and any number of variables .

A somewhat more direct way to understand that relation is to consider the contributions in the summation involving a fixed monomial  of degree . The relation then follows from the fact that

The former gives a sequence of equations:

and so on, that allows to recursively express the successive complete homogeneous symmetric polynomials in terms of the elementary symmetric polynomials; the latter gives a set of equations

and so forth, that allows doing the inverse. The first  elementary and complete homogeneous symmetric polynomials play perfectly similar roles in these relations, even though the former polynomials then become zero, whereas the latter do not. This phenomenon can be understood in the setting of the ring of symmetric functions. It has a ring automorphism that interchanges the sequences of the  elementary and first  complete homogeneous symmetric functions.

More specifically, the ring of symmetric polynomials with integer coefficients equals the integral polynomial ring 

This can be formulated by saying that 

The same is true with the ring  of integers replaced by any other commutative ring. These statements follow from analogous statements for the elementary symmetric polynomials, due to the indicated possibility of expressing either kind of symmetric polynomials in terms of the other kind.

Relation with the Stirling numbers

The evaluation at integers of complete homogeneous polynomials and elementary symmetric polynomials is related to Stirling numbers:

Relation with the monomial symmetric polynomials

Relation with power sums

Newton's identities for homogeneous symmetric polynomials give the simple recursive formula

where  and pk is the k-th power sum symmetric polynomial:  , as above.

For small  we have

Relation with symmetric tensors

Consider an -dimensional vector space  and a linear operator  with eigenvalues . Denote by  its th symmetric tensor power and  the induced operator .

Proposition:

The basis in  can be indexed by sequences , indeed, consider the symmetrizations of 
. 
 
hence this proposition is true.

Similarly one can express elementary symmetric polynomials via traces over antisymmetric tensor powers.

See also
Symmetric polynomial
Elementary symmetric polynomial
Schur polynomial
Newton's identities
MacMahon Master theorem
Symmetric function
Representation theory

References
 Macdonald, I.G. (1979), Symmetric Functions and Hall Polynomials. Oxford Mathematical Monographs. Oxford: Clarendon Press.
 Macdonald, I.G. (1995), Symmetric Functions and Hall Polynomials, second ed. Oxford: Clarendon Press.  (paperback, 1998).
 Richard P. Stanley (1999), Enumerative Combinatorics, Vol. 2. Cambridge: Cambridge University Press. 

Homogeneous polynomials
Symmetric functions